Dalkey railway station serves Dalkey in Dún Laoghaire–Rathdown, Ireland.

History
The station was opened on 10 July 1854 and was closed for goods traffic on 30 March 1964. It was preceded by Dalkey Atmospheric Railway station which opened on 29 March 1844 and closed on 12 April 1854. The ticket office is open between 07:00-10:00 AM, Monday to Friday.

Accidents and incidents
On 16 November 1979, a passenger train collided with a stationary passenger train. Thirty-six people were injured.

See also
 List of railway stations in Ireland

References

External links
Irish Rail Dalkey Station Website

Iarnród Éireann stations in Dún Laoghaire–Rathdown
Dalkey
Railway stations opened in 1854
1854 establishments in Ireland
Railway stations in the Republic of Ireland opened in the 19th century